The Shire of Dundas was a local government area about  west of Melbourne, the state capital of Victoria, Australia.

History

Dundas was first incorporated as a road district on 4 August 1857, and became a shire on 8 December 1863.

On 23 September 1994, the Shire of Dundas was abolished, and along with the City of Hamilton, the Shire of Wannon and parts of the Shire of Mount Rouse, was merged into the newly created Shire of Southern Grampians. The Macarthur hinterland area was transferred into the newly created Shire of Moyne, administered from Port Fairy.

Wards

The Shire of Dundas was divided into three ridings, each of which elected three councillors:
 South Riding
 East Riding
 West Riding

Towns and localities

Population

* Estimate in the 1958 Victorian Year Book.

References

External links
 Victorian Places - Dundas Shire

Dundas